Bibio slossonae is a species of March fly in the family Bibionidae.

References

Bibionidae
Articles created by Qbugbot
Insects described in 1872